Dennis Dunaway (born December 9, 1946, in Cottage Grove, Oregon) is an American musician, best known as the original bass guitarist for the rock band Alice Cooper (1962–1975, 1999, 2010, 2011, 2015, 2017, 2019, 2021).
He co-wrote some of the band's most notable songs, including "I'm Eighteen" and "School's Out".

Career
Dunaway's first bass was a short-scale Airline. This was used on Alice Cooper's debut album Pretties for You. The band's sophomore album, Easy Action, featured Dunaway playing a short-scale Höfner.

Later, Dunaway procured a Gibson EB-0 short scale bass, modified with a Fender Precision Bass split pickup in the treble position, that he spray painted green and called "the frog". He can be seen with it on the back cover of the Love it to Death album. Dunaway used this bass exclusively in the making of the original Alice Cooper group's first three albums. It currently is on loan to the Rock and Roll Hall of Fame. Dunaway would later switch to a Fender Jazz bass.

'Billion Dollar Babies' was the name of the band founded by Michael Bruce, Mike Marconi, Dennis Dunaway, Bob Dolin, and Neal Smith after they split from Alice Cooper in 1974.
This band was embroiled in a legal suit over the usage of the name. They only released one album, 1977's Battle Axe, before disbanding.

Dennis is married to Cindy (Smith) Dunaway, Alice Cooper's original costume designer who helped create the Shock Rock fashion style. Cindy is the sister of original Alice Cooper drummer Neal Smith.

Dennis performs on Alice Cooper's Welcome 2 My Nightmare. On July 1, 2010, when talking about the newly retitled album, Welcome 2 My Nightmare, Alice said in a Radio Metal interview: "We’ll put some of the original people on it and add some new people, I’m very happy with working with Bob (Ezrin) again." Other names mentioned were: Slash, Neal Smith, Dennis Dunaway, Steven Hunter and Dick Wagner. Dunaway and Smith wrote two songs and perform, along with Michael Bruce, on three tracks on the album, released in September 2011.  That same year, Dunaway and his former Alice Cooper bandmates were inducted into the Rock and Roll Hall of Fame, in the "Performer Category".

Dennis currently plays live with his bands, Blue Coupe which also comprises Joe and Albert Bouchard of Blue Öyster Cult fame and 5th Avenue Vampires. Blue Coupe's most recent single "You (Like Vampires)", written by John Elwood Cook, can be heard on iTunes or Pledgemusic. Dennis released his memoirs Snakes! Guillotines! Electric Chairs! (Thomas Dunne Books) in June 2015. The book has been penned with Rolling Stone writer, Chris Hodenfield.

Dunaway appears on bonus tracks for Alice Cooper's 2017 album Paranormal and on two songs of Cooper's 2021 album Detroit Stories. He also co-wrote the Detroit Stories track "Drunk and in Love".

In 2022, Dunaway wrote the afterword to Alice Cooper Confidential by authorized Alice Cooper biographer Jeffrey Morgan.

Discography

Solo (billed as Dennis Dunaway Project)
 Bones from the Yard (2006)

With Alice Cooper
 Pretties for You (1969)
 Easy Action (1970)
 Love It to Death (1971)
 Killer (1971)
 School's Out (1972)
 Billion Dollar Babies (1973)
 Muscle of Love (1973)
 1969 Live at the Whisky A Go-Go (1994)
 Welcome 2 My Nightmare (2011)
 Paranormal (2017)
 Detroit Stories (2021)

With Billion Dollar Babies
 Battle Axe (1977)

With Deadringer
 Electrocution of the Heart (1989)

With Ant-Bee
 Lunar Muzik (1997)

With Bouchard, Dunaway & Smith
 Back From Hell (2001)
 BDS Live in Paris (2003)

With 5th Avenue Vampires
 Drawing Blood (2010)

With Blue Coupe
 Tornado on the Tracks (2010)
 Million Miles More (2013)
 Eleven Even (2019)

With Hollywood Vampires
 Hollywood Vampires (2015)

References

External links
 
 
 
 

1946 births
Living people
American rock bass guitarists
American heavy metal bass guitarists
American male bass guitarists
Alice Cooper (band) members
Guitarists from Oregon
People from Cottage Grove, Oregon
American male guitarists
20th-century American bass guitarists